The 9th parallel south is a circle of latitude that is 9 degrees south of the Earth's equatorial plane. It crosses the Atlantic Ocean, Africa, the Indian Ocean, Australasia, the Pacific Ocean and South America.

The parallel passes through 11 out of the 26 states of Brazil.

Around the world
Starting at the Prime Meridian and heading eastwards, the parallel 9° south passes through:

{| class="wikitable plainrowheaders"
! scope="col" width="125" | Co-ordinates
! scope="col" | Country, territory or sea
! scope="col" | Notes
|-
| style="background:#b0e0e6;" | 
! scope="row" style="background:#b0e0e6;" | Atlantic Ocean
| style="background:#b0e0e6;" |
|-
| 
! scope="row" | 
|
|-valign="top"
| 
! scope="row" | 
|
|-
| style="background:#b0e0e6;" | 
! scope="row" style="background:#b0e0e6;" | Lake Mweru
| style="background:#b0e0e6;" |
|-
| 
! scope="row" | 
|
|-
| 
! scope="row" | 
| Mainland and island of Kilwa Kisiwani
|-valign="top"
| style="background:#b0e0e6;" | 
! scope="row" style="background:#b0e0e6;" | Indian Ocean
| style="background:#b0e0e6;" | Passing just north of Providence Atoll,  Passing just south of the islands of Java, Bali, Nusa Penida and Lombok, 
|-
| 
! scope="row" | 
| Island of Sumbawa
|-valign="top"
| style="background:#b0e0e6;" | 
! scope="row" style="background:#b0e0e6;" | Indian Ocean
| style="background:#b0e0e6;" | Sumba Strait Savu Sea - passing just south of the island of Flores, 
|-
| 
! scope="row" | 
| Island of Timor - for about 16 km
|-
| 
! scope="row" | 
| Island of Timor - for about 14 km
|-
| 
! scope="row" | 
| Island of Timor - for about 6 km
|-
| 
! scope="row" | 
| Island of Timor
|-
| style="background:#b0e0e6;" | 
! scope="row" style="background:#b0e0e6;" | Timor Sea
| style="background:#b0e0e6;" |
|-
| style="background:#b0e0e6;" | 
! scope="row" style="background:#b0e0e6;" | Arafura Sea
| style="background:#b0e0e6;" |
|-
| 
! scope="row" | 
| Island of New Guinea
|-
| 
! scope="row" | 
| Islands of New Guinea and Parama
|-
| style="background:#b0e0e6;" | 
! scope="row" style="background:#b0e0e6;" | Coral Sea
| style="background:#b0e0e6;" | Gulf of Papua
|-
| 
! scope="row" | 
| Island of New Guinea
|-
| style="background:#b0e0e6;" | 
! scope="row" style="background:#b0e0e6;" | Solomon Sea
| style="background:#b0e0e6;" | Oro Bay
|-
| 
! scope="row" | 
| Island of New Guinea
|-valign="top"
| style="background:#b0e0e6;" | 
! scope="row" style="background:#b0e0e6;" | Solomon Sea
| style="background:#b0e0e6;" | Passing between the D'Entrecasteaux and Trobriand Islands, 
|-
| 
! scope="row" | 
| Islands of Nusam and Woodlark
|-valign="top"
| style="background:#b0e0e6;" | 
! scope="row" style="background:#b0e0e6;" | Solomon Sea
| style="background:#b0e0e6;" | Passing just south of the islands of Tetepare, Vangunu and Nggatokae, 
|-
| 
! scope="row" | 
| Russell Islands
|-
| style="background:#b0e0e6;" | 
! scope="row" style="background:#b0e0e6;" | New Georgia Sound
| style="background:#b0e0e6;" | Passing just north of Savo Island, 
|-
| 
! scope="row" | 
| Florida Islands
|-
| style="background:#b0e0e6;" | 
! scope="row" style="background:#b0e0e6;" | Indispensable Strait
| style="background:#b0e0e6;" |
|-
| 
! scope="row" | 
| Island of Malaita
|-valign="top"
| style="background:#b0e0e6;" | 
! scope="row" style="background:#b0e0e6;" | Pacific Ocean
| style="background:#b0e0e6;" | Passing between the Funafuti and Nukulaelae atolls,  Passing just north of Nukunonu atoll, 
|-
| 
! scope="row" | 
| Penrhyn Island
|-valign="top"
| style="background:#b0e0e6;" | 
! scope="row" style="background:#b0e0e6;" | Pacific Ocean
| style="background:#b0e0e6;" | Passing just south of Nuku Hiva and Ua Huka islands, 
|-
| 
! scope="row" | 
|
|-valign="top"
| 
! scope="row" | 
| Acre Amazonas Rondônia - for about 8 km Amazonas - for about 20 km Rondônia Mato Grosso Pará Tocantins Maranhão Piauí Bahia Pernambuco - passing just north of the city of Petrolina and the city of the Juazeiro, Bahia Bahia - passing through the São Francisco River Pernambuco - for about 13 km Bahia - for about 5 km Pernambuco Alagoas - for about 20 km Pernambuco - for about 8 km Alagoas - for about 15 km Pernambuco Alagoas - passing just north of the city of Maceió
|-
| style="background:#b0e0e6;" | 
! scope="row" style="background:#b0e0e6;" | Atlantic Ocean
| style="background:#b0e0e6;" |
|-
|}

See also
8th parallel south
10th parallel south

s09